Iamonte is a surname. It may refer to:

 Giuseppe Iamonte (born 1949), Italian criminal and member of the 'Ndrangheta
 Natale Iamonte (1927-2015), Italian criminal and boss of the 'Ndrangheta
 'Ndrina Iamonte, Italian crime family from Melito di Porto Salvo, in the Province of Reggio calabria

Italian-language surnames